The Revelation is the fourth studio album by the American rock band Rev Theory. It was released on September 9, 2016, through Another Century Records. It is the band's first full-length studio album since Justice.

Track listing

References 

2016 albums
Rev Theory albums